The Shell and Pennzoil Grand Prix of Houston Presented by the Greater Houston Honda Dealers was an annual auto race on the IndyCar Series circuit. It was held in a street circuit located in downtown Houston for four years, then returned after a four-year hiatus for two years on a course laid out in the parking lot of the Reliant/NRG Park complex.  Before resuming in 2013, the last race was held on April 22, 2007, (with the IRL merger canceling the 2008 event just two months prior to the event).

Race history

From 1998 to 2001, CART held a race on Houston's downtown streets, adjacent to the George R. Brown Convention Center. This event was sponsored by the oil company Texaco, and named the Texaco Grand Prix of Houston. However, construction in downtown Houston resulted in the race not being renewed for the 2002 CART season.

In 2005, the Champ Car World Series announced that it would be making a return to Houston in 2006; for some time, series directors had wanted to make a return to the city. The 2006 event was held on May 13 as the second round of the 2006 Champ Car schedule. However, this time the race was held on a 1.7-mile temporary street circuit on the Reliant Park complex instead of the downtown streets and was the first race held on a street course to run at night in the history of Champ Car or its precursor series (in 2003 and 2004, Champ Car ran under the lights at Burke Lakefront Airport in Cleveland, Ohio). Also, the American Le Mans Series held an event, the Lone Star Grand Prix, on the previous night, marking only the second time Champ Car and American Le Mans promoted their own events in the same city on the same weekend (they joined in 2003 for the Grand Prix Americas in Miami, Florida). For 2007, JAG Flocomponents picked up the naming rights to the previously unnamed street course, naming it JAGFlo Speedway at Reliant Park.

Mi-Jack Promotions had a handshake deal with IndyCar to revive the event in October 2011, however the required sponsorship was not found by June 2010. IndyCar officials announced the event will return in 2013 sponsored by Royal Dutch Shell and using a tweaked version of the 2006–2007 course.  The event has a 5-year race contract through 2017 with IndyCar and Shell, using its Pennzoil brand of motor oil, is signed for 4-years as the event's title sponsor.

On the final race lap of the 2013 event the car of Dario Franchitti was launched airborne in turn five when it made contact with the car of Takuma Sato. Franchitti's car flew into the catch-fencing, displacing a portion of the fence and sending debris into the stands, injuring 14. Franchitti suffered a broken ankle, broken back, and concussion, injuries which led him to retire from racing later that year.

IndyCar & Mi-Jack Promotions announced on August 29, 2014, that the Houston doubleheader at NRG Park has been canceled for 2015 due to scheduling issues.

Features 
The Champ Car paddock was located inside Reliant Arena. In 2006, the Newman/Haas, RuSPORT, Dale Coyne, and Team Australia haulers were on the northern side, while the Forsythe, Rocketsports, PKV, and CTE-HVM teams were on the southern side. The 2006 race was also the first and only Champ Car or IndyCar race to ever be held on a road or street course at night under the lights. 2007 and subsequent runnings have been day races.

Race winners

Champ Car/IndyCar

1998: Race shortened due to heavy rainshower that caused poor visibility.
2006: Race shortened due to time limit.
2014: First race shortened due to time limit.

Atlantics/Indy Lights

Lap Records

The official race lap records at the Grand Prix of Houston circuits are listed as:

References

External links
 Grand Prix of Houston Homepage

 
Champ Car circuits
IndyCar Series tracks
Motorsport venues in Texas
1998 establishments in Texas